The Japan Pavilion is a Japanese-themed pavilion that is part of the World Showcase, within Epcot at Walt Disney World in Orlando, Florida, United States. Its location is between The American Adventure and Morocco pavilions.

History
The Japan Pavilion is one of the original World Showcase pavilions and had been in planning since the late 1970s. Many attractions have been proposed for the pavilion and one show building was built, but left unused. Meet the World was one planned attraction and was a clone of the attraction Meet the World that was once at Tokyo Disneyland. However, management thought that the Japanese film's omission of World War II might upset many Veterans, it was dropped. The show was so close to opening that the show building and rotating platform was built, but not used.

The pavilion at EPCOT is one of the World Showcase pavilions since Tokyo Disneyland is in Japan itself.

Planned attractions

Numerous attractions were planned and purposed. Only one (Meet the World) was constructed.
For years, Imagineers have considered building an indoor roller coaster attraction based on Japan's Mount Fuji. The attraction would have been designed similarly to Matterhorn Bobsleds from Disneyland. The coaster would have been housed inside a replica of Mount Fuji. At one point, Godzilla or a large lizard attacking guests in their cars was considered. Fujifilm originally wanted to sponsor the ride in the early 1990s, but Kodak, a major Epcot sponsor, convinced Disney to decline the sponsorship. Luckily, the Matterhorn derived design elements survived to be incorporated into Expedition Everest at Disney's Animal Kingdom Park. 
Another proposed attraction was a walk-through version of "Circle-Vision", in which guests would board and walk through a Shinkansen (bullet train) and look through windows (actually film screens) that showcase Japan's changing landscapes. The train would have shaken and moved like a train traveling through the countryside.
Meet the World (from Tokyo Disneyland) was planned for the pavilion. Unlike the other attractions that did not make it past the planning stages, Meet the World's show building was constructed with the theater going to be on the second floor. However, due to miscalculations made in the building's design, the rotating theater put a lot of stress on the support beams. For the attraction to be able to function safely, the show building would have to have major rework done. As Epcot's construction was behind schedule, it was decided to move forward without the attraction. Today, the current space is used for rehearsals and storage.

Layout

The Japan Pavilion is made up of buildings surrounding a courtyard. The entrance to the courtyard features a Japanese Pagoda. A torii gate decorates the water in front of the pavilion. The area is filled with Japanese pools and gardens. At the end of the courtyard is the gate to a Japanese castle, including a moat, which leads into a display of Japanese culture.

Attractions and services

Attraction
 Bijutsu-kan – An exhibition gallery hosting long-term exhibits on Japanese art and culture. Its current presentation, "Kawaii Life", features a look at Japan's "Culture of Cute."
 DuckTales World Showcase Adventure  (2022-Present)

Former attractions
 Kim Possible World Showcase Adventure (2009 – 2012)
 Agent P's World Showcase Adventure (2012 – 2020)

Dining
Teppan Edo is a teppanyaki-style restaurant, meaning that the food is cooked right in front of you at the table. The restaurant is directly above, and connected to, the Mitsukoshi department store. The decor and theming is intended to reflect the "vivaciousness" of the Edo period. Foods that are cooked on the table are steaks, chicken, shrimps, scallops, and vegetables. Select sushi rolls, miso soup, edamame, and tempura is offered as an appetizer, and various ice cream flavors, as well as mousses are options for dessert. Kids meal are served in monorail-shaped boxes.
 Tokyo Dining (Reopening in Summer 2023): Originally occupied by two separate restaurants, Tempura Kiku and the Matsu No Ma lounge, Tokyo Dining is now a sushi restaurant. They serve sushi, tempura and some other grilled items (such as steak, grilled chicken and so on).
 Katsura Grill: A counter-service restaurant located on a hill adjacent to the pagoda.
 Kabuki Cafe: Kaki-gori
 Garden House: Sake
 Takumi Tei

Shopping
 Mitsukoshi Department Store: The store is separated into four zones: Festivity, Silence, Harmony, and Interest, and sells many Japanese items, including clothing, jewelry, books, manga, anime items (such as posters), and toys. It has been expanded in recent years to include a far greater variety of items than before. More specifically, a greater portion of the store sells Japanese pop culture related items, presumably to take advantage of the growing interest in these types of products in America. To date, this is the only remaining branch of Mitsukoshi located in North America following the closure of Mitsukoshi's New York City location.

Entertainment

Matsuriza

Matsuriza are traditional Taiko drummers and a Japanese Storytellers located at the base of the pagoda.

References

External links

 Walt Disney World Resort – Japan Pavilion

Walt Disney Parks and Resorts attractions
Epcot
World Showcase
Japanese-American culture in Florida
1982 establishments in Florida